Villa Vil is a village and municipality in Catamarca Province in northwestern Argentina.

References

External links
 Museo Integral de la Reserva de Biosfera de Laguna Blanca

Populated places in Catamarca Province